Jean Carlos Simancas (born July 17, 1949 in Maracaibo) is a Venezuelan theater and television actor popular for his various roles in telenovelas.

Biography
Simancas developed a passion for acting while he was studying drama in high school. After finishing high school, he continued with further drama studies at the University Theater of Zulia. After acting in several theater productions, simancas received his first starring role in 1977 in the telenovela titled Tormento.

Telenovelas
 Valentina (1975) as Eduardo Lacoste
 Carolina (1976) as Ricardo Jimenez 
 La hija de Juana Crespo (1977) as David
 Sangre azul (1979) as Álvaro 
 Marielena (1981)
 Luz Marina (1981)
 Luisana Mia (1981) as Juan Miguel Bernal
 Qué pasó con Jacqueline? (1982)
 Claudia (1982)
 Amor gitano (1983) as Augusto
 Más allá del silencio (1985)
 Amor prohibido (1986) as Miguel Ángel 
 Mi nombre es amor (1987) as Joaquín
 La Revancha (1989) as Alejandro
 Disparen a matar (1990) as Santiago
 Extraordinary Adventure of an Ordinary Papa (1990) as Domingo Villaverde 
 Mundo de Fieras (1991) as José Manuel Bustamante 
 Por Amarte Tanto (1993) as Luis Arturo
 Ka Ina (1995) as Ricardo León 
 Todo Por Tu Amor (1997) as Samuel Montalbán
 Niña Mimada (1998) as Aurelio Echegaray
 El País de las mujeres (1999) as Fabián Aristimuño
 Toda Mujer (1999) as Marcelo Bustamante
 Rizo (1999) as Alejandro del Rey
 Mas que Amor... Frenesi (2001) as Orestes Lara 
 La invasora (2003) as Ignacio Martínez Aguilar
 Negra consentida (2004) as Caetano Nascimento
 Amantes (2005) as Humberto Rivera
 Por todo lo alto (2006) as Ignacio Urquiaga 
 Arroz con Leche (2007) as Fabio 'El Chef' 
 ¿Vieja Yo? (2008) as ¿Vieja Yo?
 La mujer perfecta (2010) as Crúz Mario Polanco
 Válgame Dios (2012) as Innocente Castillo 
 Corazón Esmeralda (2014) as César Augusto Salvatierra

References

External links
 
 Jean Carlo Simancas at 
 Jean Carlos Simancas: "Mi relación con el público ha sido maravillosa" at 

Living people
1949 births
Venezuelan male telenovela actors
Venezuelan male stage actors
20th-century Venezuelan male actors
21st-century Venezuelan male actors
People from Maracaibo